The 1980 Austrian Open , also known as the 1980 Head Cup for sponsorship reasons,  was a combined men's and women's tennis tournament played on outdoor clay courts. It was categorized as a two-star tournament and was part of the men's 1980 Volvo Grand Prix circuit and of the Colgate Series of the women's 1980 WTA Tour. It took place at the Tennis Stadium Kitzbühel in Kitzbühel, Austria and was held from 21 July through 27 July 1980. First-seeded Guillermo Vilas won the men's singles title and the accompanying $13,000 first-prize money while Virginia Ruzici won the women's singles event.

Finals

Men's singles
 Guillermo Vilas defeated  Ivan Lendl 6–3, 6–2, 6–2

Women's singles
 Virginia Ruzici defeated  Hana Mandlíková 3–5, 6–1, ret.

Men's doubles
 Ulrich Marten /  Klaus Eberhard defeated  Carlos Kirmayr /  Chris Lewis 6–4, 3–6, 6–4

Women's doubles
 Claudia Kohde /  Eva Pfaff defeated  Hana Mandlíková /  Renáta Tomanová w.o.

References

External links
 International Tennis Federation (ITF)  – Men's tournament details
 International Tennis Federation (ITF)  – Women's tournament details

Austrian Open
Austrian Open Kitzbühel
Austrian Open